John Wilfred Loughlin (February 28, 1896 – June 25, 1966) was a Canadian ice hockey player who played one season in the National Hockey League for the Toronto St. Patricks. Loughlin appeared in 14 games during the 1923–24 season. He also played five seasons in the Pacific Coast Hockey Association, and two in the Western Canada Hockey League between 1919 and 1926, retiring in 1927.

He was born in Carroll, Manitoba. His brother, Clem Loughlin, was also an ice hockey player.

Career
In October 1923, Loughlin was traded for cash to the Toronto St. Patricks where he played 14 games, with 0 points and 2 penalty minutes. He later played for the Regina Capitals, the Edmonton Eskimos, the Winnipeg Maroons, and the Moose Jaw Maroons. He retired in 1927.

Career statistics

Regular season and playoffs

Awards and achievements
 PCHA Second All-Star Team (1921)

References

External links
 

1896 births
1966 deaths
Canadian ice hockey defencemen
Edmonton Eskimos (ice hockey) players
Ice hockey people from Manitoba
People from Westman Region, Manitoba
Place of death missing
Regina Capitals players
Toronto St. Pats players
Victoria Aristocrats players
Victoria Cougars (1911–1926) players
Western Canada Hockey League players
Winnipeg Monarchs players
Winnipeg Maroons players